Sonal Chauhan (born 16 May 1987) is an Indian actress, singer and model who predominantly works in Telugu and Hindi films.

She made her acting debut with Hindi film Jannat and her Telugu film debut with Rainbow, both in 2008. Chauhan made her Kannada film debut with Cheluveye Ninne Nodalu (2010) and Tamil debut with Inji Iduppazhagi (2015). She has been part of successful films including Legend (2014), Pandaga Chesko (2015), Size Zero (2015) and Dictator (2016).

Early life
Chauhan was born in a Rajput family. She attended Delhi Public School in Noida. She then studied Philosophy honours at Gargi College in New Delhi.

Career

Modelling career
She was crowned Miss World Tourism 2005 at Miri, Sarawak state of Malaysia. She is the first Indian to have claimed the Miss World Tourism title. She also appeared on the cover pages of FHM.

Acting career

She first appeared on screen in Himesh Reshammiya's Aap Kaa Surroor. She appeared opposite Emraan Hashmi. She has also signed a three-film deal with the Bhatts, of which two are pending. 
She also sang a duet with KK for the song "Kaise Bataoon" in the film 3G.

She acted in a Telugu film Legend costarring Nandamuri Balakrishna and marking her comeback to Tollywood. Her next project was Pandaga Chesko. In early 2015, she signed two Telugu films: Size Zero opposite Arya and Sher opposite Nandamuri Kalyan Ram.

In early July 2015, she signed another Telugu film, Dictator.

Filmography

Films

Television

Music videos

Discography

Awards and nominations

See also
List of Indian film actresses

References

External links

 
 
 

Indian film actresses
Actresses in Hindi cinema
Actresses in Kannada cinema
Actresses in Tamil cinema
Actresses in Telugu cinema
Living people
Actresses from Delhi
People from Noida
Female models from Delhi
21st-century Indian actresses
Gargi College alumni
1987 births